is a train station in Nakamura-ku, Nagoya, Aichi Prefecture, Japan.

This station provides access to Nagoya Daiichi Red Cross Hospital, the Nagoya Keirin track, and Toyokuni Shrine, a shrine dedicated to Toyotomi Hideyoshi.

Lines

 (Station number: H05)

Layout

Platforms

References

External links
 

Railway stations in Japan opened in 1969
Railway stations in Aichi Prefecture